The Washington Browns were a minor league baseball team from Washington, Indiana, that played in the Class C Central League in 1897.

Team history 
On February 7, 1897, the Washington Browns were formed as a charter member of the Class C Central League. Joining the Browns in the six-team league were the Cairo Egyptians, Evansville Brewers, Nashville Centennials, Paducah Little Colonels, and Terre Haute Hottentots. Washington's uniforms were brown and red.

Severe financial problems forced the Washington team to disband on July 20, 1897. With low home attendance, the local Athletic Association had contributed $12,000 to support the franchise before it folded. The entire league was facing the same financial hardships and followed suit in folding. As of July 19, 1897, the final day of play, the Browns were in third place with a 33–32 (.508) record.

References 

Defunct Central League (1897) teams
Baseball teams established in 1897
Sports clubs disestablished in 1897
Professional baseball teams in Indiana
1897 establishments in Indiana
1897 disestablishments in Indiana
Washington, Indiana
Defunct baseball teams in Indiana
Baseball teams disestablished in 1897